Tour de l'Avenir is a French road bicycle racing stage race, which started in 1961 as a race similar to the Tour de France and over much of the same course but for amateurs and for semi-professionals known as independents. Felice Gimondi, Joop Zoetemelk, Greg LeMond, Miguel Induráin, Laurent Fignon, Egan Bernal, and Tadej Pogačar won the Tour de l'Avenir and went on to win 15 Tours de France, with an additional 10 podium placings between them.

The race was created in 1961 by Jacques Marchand, the editor of L'Équipe, to attract teams from the Soviet Union and other communist nations that had no professional riders to enter the Tour de France. Until 1967, it took place earlier the same day as some of the stages of the Tour de France and shared the latter part of each stage's route, but moved to September and a separate course from 1968 onwards. It became the Grand Prix de l'Avenir in 1970, the Trophée Peugeot de l'Avenir from  1972 to 1979  and the Tour de la Communauté Européenne from 1986 to 1990. It was restricted to amateurs from 1961 to 1980, before opening to professionals in 1981. After 1992, it was open to all riders who were less than 25 years old. Since 2007 it is for riders 23 or younger.

Since 2007, the tour has been a national team competition.

Winners

References

External links

 
Cycle races in France
Men's road bicycle races
Recurring sporting events established in 1961
1961 establishments in France
Super Prestige Pernod races